Henry Daniel may refer to:

Henry Daniel (friar) (fl. 1379), English Dominican friar
Henry Daniel (politician) (1786–1873), United States Representative from Kentucky 
Henry Daniel (classicist) (1836–1919), English classicist and clergyman, Provost of Worcester College, Oxford, and operator of the Daniel Press

See also
Henry Daniell (1894–1963), English actor
Henry Daniels (1912–2000), British statistician
Henry John Daniels (1850–1934), member of the Queensland Legislative Assembly

Harry Daniel (disambiguation)
Daniel Henry (disambiguation)